The Fog Horn and Other Stories is a collection of four short stories by Ray Bradbury.  The collection, published in Japan, is published in English for school use.

Contents
 "A Story of Love"
 "The Miracles of Jamie"
 "The Fog Horn"
 "Forever and the Earth"

References

External links
 
 

1981 short story collections
Short story collections by Ray Bradbury